Nannophrys marmorata, commonly known as  Kirtisinghe's rock frog or marbled streamlined frog, is a species of frog endemic to Sri Lanka. It used to be placed in the large frog family Ranidae but a phylogenetic study was undertaken using DNA sequences and it is now included in the family Dicroglossidae. Its natural habitats are tropical moist lowland forests, moist montane forests, rivers and streams. It is threatened by habitat loss.

Description
Kirtisinghe's rock frog is a small animal with a broad, short head and rounded snout. The eardrums, visible just behind the prominent eyes, are about half the size of the eyes. The body is stout and the legs are moderately short. The dorsal surface is brown blotched with darker streaks and the ventral surface is pale grey. The legs are transversely banded in dark brown.

Distribution and habitat
It is a semi-aquatic species and is found in and beside fast flowing mountain streams in forested areas, under boulders, in rock crevices and on wet rocks. The tadpoles are also found on rocks in the splash zone near the torrent.

Status
Kirtisinghe's rock frog seems to be declining in numbers and it is listed as "Critically endangered" in the IUCN Red List of Threatened Species. This is because it occurs as several separate populations in a total area of only  and its habitat is being lost because of livestock grazing and tourism, and the streams in which it lives may be being polluted by agrochemicals from tea and cardamom plantations.

References

Nannophrys
Frogs of Sri Lanka
Endemic fauna of Sri Lanka
Taxonomy articles created by Polbot
Amphibians described in 1946